The 1998 Pennsylvania 500 was the 18th stock car race of the 1998 NASCAR Winston Cup Series season and the 26th iteration of the event. The race was held on Sunday, July 26, 1998, in Long Pond, Pennsylvania, at Pocono Raceway, a 2.5 miles (4.0 km) triangular permanent course. The race took the scheduled 200 laps to complete. At race's end, Hendrick Motorsports driver Jeff Gordon would dominate the majority of the race to take his 34th career NASCAR Winston Cup Series victory and his fifth victory of the season. To fill out the podium, Mark Martin and Jeff Burton, both drivers for Roush Racing, would finish second and third, respectively.

Background 

The race was held at Pocono Raceway, which is a three-turn superspeedway located in Long Pond, Pennsylvania. The track hosts two annual NASCAR Sprint Cup Series races, as well as one Xfinity Series and Camping World Truck Series event. Until 2019, the track also hosted an IndyCar Series race.

Pocono Raceway is one of a very few NASCAR tracks not owned by either Speedway Motorsports, Inc. or International Speedway Corporation. It is operated by the Igdalsky siblings Brandon, Nicholas, and sister Ashley, and cousins Joseph IV and Chase Mattioli, all of whom are third-generation members of the family-owned Mattco Inc, started by Joseph II and Rose Mattioli.

Outside of the NASCAR races, the track is used throughout the year by Sports Car Club of America (SCCA) and motorcycle clubs as well as racing schools and an IndyCar race. The triangular oval also has three separate infield sections of racetrack – North Course, East Course and South Course. Each of these infield sections use a separate portion of the tri-oval to complete the track. During regular non-race weekends, multiple clubs can use the track by running on different infield sections. Also some of the infield sections can be run in either direction, or multiple infield sections can be put together – such as running the North Course and the South Course and using the tri-oval to connect the two.

Entry list 

 (R) denotes rookie driver.

Practice

First practice 
The first practice session was held on Friday, July 24, at 10:35 AM EST. The session would last for one hour and 25 minutes.

Second practice 
The second practice session was held on Saturday, July 25, at 9:30 AM EST. The session would last for one hour and 30 minutes.

Final practice 
The final practice session, sometimes referred to as Happy Hour, was held on Saturday, July 25, after the preliminary 1998 ARCA Pepsi 400k. The session would last for one hour.

Qualifying 
Qualifying was split into two rounds. The first round was held on Friday, July 24, at 3:00 PM EST. Each driver would have one lap to set a time. During the first round, the top 25 drivers in the round would be guaranteed a starting spot in the race. If a driver was not able to guarantee a spot in the first round, they had the option to scrub their time from the first round and try and run a faster lap time in a second round qualifying run, held on Saturday, July 25, at 11:30 AM EST. As with the first round, each driver would have one lap to set a time. On January 24, 1998, NASCAR would announce that the amount of provisionals given would be increased from last season. Positions 26-36 would be decided on time, while positions 37-43 would be based on provisionals. Six spots are awarded by the use of provisionals based on owner's points. The seventh is awarded to a past champion who has not otherwise qualified for the race. If no past champion needs the provisional, the next team in the owner points will be awarded a provisional.

Three drivers would fail to qualify: Randy MacDonald, Gary Bradberry, and Jimmy Horton.

Full qualifying results 

*Time not available.

Race results

References 

Pennsylvania 500
Pennsylvania 500
NASCAR races at Pocono Raceway
Pennsylvania 500